The Pit is a 2020 Latvian drama film directed by Dace Pūce. It was selected as the Latvian entry for the Best International Feature Film at the 94th Academy Awards.

Plot
After she makes disparaging remarks about his father, a ten-year-old boy tricks a girl into falling into a pit.

Cast
 Damir Onackis as Markuss
 Luize Birkenberga as Emilija
 Indra Burkovska as Sailor
 Agata Buzek as Smaida
 Egons Dombrovskis as Roberts

See also
 List of submissions to the 94th Academy Awards for Best International Feature Film
 List of Latvian submissions for the Academy Award for Best International Feature Film

References

External links
 

2020 films
2020 drama films
Latvian drama films
Latvian-language films